If You Don't Have Anything Nice to Say... is the second studio album by post-hardcore band The Bunny the Bear, released through Victory Records on June 28, 2011. The album peaked at number 34 on the Billboard Top Heatseekers chart.

The album's lead single "Aisle" was independently released in December 2010, and caught the attention of Victory Records, who signed the band shortly after. The album spawned a dual single in October 2011 featuring the tracks "Ocean Floor" and "C'est Pas Si Loin", both of which were released with accompanying music videos. "Aisle" remains the band's most well-known song, accumulating over 1.02 million views on YouTube as of December 2015.

The tracks "Prelude to Pregnancy" and "Lust Touch Seed" were re-recorded from the band's 2010 debut album The Bunny The Bear.

Track listing

Chart performance

Personnel

The Bunny the Bear
Chris "The Bear" Hutka – clean vocals
Matthew "The Bunny" Tybor – unclean vocals, songwriting, lyrics
Erik Kogut – guitars
Amber Kogut – guitars
Derek Anthony – bass
Brian Dietz – drums, percussion

Additional personnel
Doug White – additional guitars, producing
Alan Douches – mastering
Natalie Oyler – composition of synthesizers and piano in "C'est Pas Si Loin"
Seth Cooper – additional vocals on "Rough Eyes"
Jessica Steward – additional vocals on "Sympathy for the Queen of Lies"

References

2011 albums
The Bunny the Bear albums
Victory Records albums